Jaime Gonzalez (born 25 July 1954) is a Brazilian professional golfer. He is one of the few from his country to have enjoyed success on the international circuit.

Gonzalez was born in São Paulo to a golfing family. His father Mário won the Spanish Open as an amateur in 1947. Gonzalez had a lot of success an amateur, winning the Brazil Amateur Championship three times (1969, 1971, 1972) as a teenager. He would win the tournament one more time when he was in college. He attended Oklahoma State University in the United States and won the individual title at the 1974 Eisenhower Trophy.

Gonzalez turned professional in 1977 and shortly thereafter represented Brazil twice in the World Cup, in 1978 and 1979.

Gonzalez earned membership on the PGA Tour for three seasons (1978, 1980, 1981) but did not have much success. His only top ten was a T-5 at the 1980 Sammy Davis Jr.-Greater Hartford Open. In 1982, he turned to Europe where he had much more success. He played on the European Tour between 1982 and 1987 and won an event, the 1984 St. Mellion Timeshare TPC. In addition, a month after his victory, he was in the top-10 of the 1984 Open Championship after the first two rounds. He eventually finished T-28. His rank on the European Tour Order of Merit was #16 that year, his best ever.

Amateur wins
1969 Brazil Amateur Open Championship
1971 Brazil Amateur Open Championship
1972 Brazil Amateur Open Championship
1976 Brazil Amateur Open Championship

Professional wins (2)

European Tour wins (1)

European Tour playoff record (1–0)

Other wins (1)
1980 Oklahoma Open

Results in major championships

Note: Gonzalez only played in The Open Championship.

CUT = missed the half-way cut
"T" = tied

Team appearances
Amateur
Eisenhower Trophy (representing Brazil): 1970, 1972, 1974 (joint individual leader), 1976

Professional
World Cup (representing Brazil): 1978, 1979
Hennessy Cognac Cup (representing the Rest of the World): 1982, 1984
Dunhill Cup (representing Brazil): 1985

See also 

 Fall 1977 PGA Tour Qualifying School graduates
Fall 1979 PGA Tour Qualifying School graduates

References

External links

Brazilian male golfers
Oklahoma State Cowboys golfers
European Tour golfers
PGA Tour golfers
Sportspeople from São Paulo
1954 births
Living people